Goofus may refer to:
Couesnophone, saxophone-like musical instrument also known as Goofus
"Goofus" (song), 1930 song later recorded by The Carpenters
Goofus, character in Goofus and Gallant American comic strip
Goofus glass, type of early 20th-century glass
Goofus bird, mythical American backward-flying bird